Aima, Dakrya & Idrotas (Blood, Tears & Sweat) is the fourth studio album by Greek singer Sakis Rouvas, released in November 1994 in Greece and Cyprus by PolyGram Records Greece. This album was Rouvas' primary collaboration with singer-songwriter and multi-instrumentalist Nikos Karvelas.

Album information

Production history
The album was recorded throughout the second and third quarters of 1994. In 1995, when asked about the success of the album and a further collaboration with Rouvas and why he had chosen to work with him, Karvelas replied:

Track listing

Release history

Music videos
"Aima, Dakrya & Idrotas" (Director: Manos Geranis, Writer: Ilias Psinakis)
"Ela Mou" (Director: Kostas Kapetanidis, Writer: Ilias Psinakis)
"Xana" (Director: Ilias Psinakis / View Studio)
"Mia Fora" (Director: Kostas Kapetanidis, Writer: Ilias Psinakis)

References

External links
Sakis Rouvas' official website
IFPI Greece official website with Greek charts

1994 albums
Albums produced by Nikos Karvelas
Greek-language albums
Sakis Rouvas albums
Universal Music Greece albums